Films produced in Sri Lanka in the 1950s.

1950

1951

1952

1953

1954

1955

1956

1957

1958

1959

See also
 Cinema of Sri Lanka
 List of Sri Lankan films

1950s
Films
Sri Lanka